Andrew Prout is a New Hampshire politician.

Career
On November 8, 2016, Prout was elected to the New Hampshire House of Representatives where he represents the Hillsborough 37 district. He assumed office later in 2016. He is a Republican.

Personal life
Prout resides in Hudson, New Hampshire. Prout is married and has three children.

References

Living people
People from Hudson, New Hampshire
Republican Party members of the New Hampshire House of Representatives
21st-century American politicians
Year of birth missing (living people)